Niederweningen is a municipality in the district of Dielsdorf in the canton of Zürich in Switzerland.

History
Niederweningen is first mentioned between 1096 and 1111 as Waningen. In 1269 it was mentioned as Nidirunweningin.

The railway reached Niederweningen in 1891 with the opening of the Swiss Northeastern Railway's Wehntal line. The line was extended by a further  to its current terminus in 1938.

In 1890 the most important site of Ice Age animals in Switzerland was discovered in Niederweningen. In 2003 the remains of a Mammoth were found, and further finds resulted in the establishment of the present Mammutmuseum Niederweningen near the site of the first findings.

The psychiatrist Adolf Meyer was born in Niederweningen in 1866.

Geography

Of this area, 48.2% is used for agricultural purposes, while 38.3% is forested. Of the rest of the land, 13.1% is settled (buildings or roads) and the remainder (0.4%) is non-productive (rivers, glaciers or mountains).

The municipality stretches along the Surb river through the Wehntal from the northern edge of the Lägern ridge to the new housing developments on the southern face of the Egg.

Demographics
, 11.1% of the population was made up of foreign nationals. Over the last 10 years the population has grown at a rate of 37.8%. Most of the population speaks German (90.8%), with Italian being second most common (1.7%) and Serbo-Croatian being third (1.4%).

In the 2007 election the most popular party was the SVP which received 39.1% of the vote. The next three most popular parties were the SPS (13.8%), the Green Party (13.7%) and the FDP (10.2%).

The age distribution of the population is children and teenagers (0–19 years old) make up 27% of the population, while adults (20–64 years old) make up 64.9% and seniors (over 64 years old) make up 8.1%. In Niederweningen about 83.3% of the population (between age 25–64) have completed either non-mandatory upper secondary education or additional higher education (either university or a Fachhochschule).

Niederweningen has an unemployment rate of 2.01%. , there were 54 people employed in the primary economic sector and about 22 businesses involved in this sector. 453 people are employed in the secondary sector and there are 13 businesses in this sector. 233 people are employed in the tertiary sector, with 66 businesses in this sector.
The historical population is given in the following table:

Sights

Niederweningen is home the Mammoth Museum (Mammutmuseum). In 1890, workers building the railroad through the valley discovered mammoth bones, which were housed in the Zoological Museum in Zurich. In 2003 a 34,000-year-old complete mammoth skeleton was discovered not far from the 1890 site. In 2005 a museum was established in Niederweningen to house the skeletons. While parts of at least 9 skeletons were discovered, the museum houses only one complete skeleton. The museum also includes displays of other ice age animals and artifacts from more recent human settlements.

Transport 
Niederweningen is served by two railway stations. Niederweningen railway station is a terminal station of the Zürich S-Bahn on the line  and is a 35-minute ride from Zürich Hauptbahnhof. Niederweningen Dorf railway station is one stop down the line towards Zurich, and is served by the same trains.

References

External links 

  

 
Municipalities of the canton of Zürich